In mathematics, an ellipse is a plane curve surrounding two focal points, such that for all points on the curve, the sum of the two distances to the focal points is a constant. It generalizes a circle, which is the special type of ellipse in which the two focal points are the same.

An ellipse has a simple algebraic solution for its area, but only approximations for its perimeter (also known as circumference), for which integration is required to obtain an exact solution.

Analytically, the equation of a standard ellipse centered at the origin with width  and height  is:
 

The standard parametric equation is:
 

Ellipses are the closed type of conic section: a plane curve tracing the intersection of a cone with a plane (see figure). Ellipses have many similarities with the other two forms of conic sections, parabolas and hyperbolas, both of which are open and unbounded. An angled cross section of a cylinder is also an ellipse.

An ellipse may also be defined in terms of one focal point and a line outside the ellipse called the directrix: for all points on the ellipse, the ratio between the distance to the focus and the distance to the directrix is a constant. This constant ratio is the above-mentioned eccentricity:
 

Ellipses are common in physics, astronomy and engineering. For example, the orbit of each planet in the Solar System is approximately an ellipse with the Sun at one focus point (more precisely, the focus is the barycenter of the Sunplanet pair). The same is true for moons orbiting planets and all other systems of two astronomical bodies. The shapes of planets and stars are often well described by ellipsoids. A circle viewed from a side angle looks like an ellipse: that is, the ellipse is the image of a circle under parallel or perspective projection. The ellipse is also the simplest Lissajous figure formed when the horizontal and vertical motions are sinusoids with the same frequency: a similar effect leads to elliptical polarization of light in optics.

The name,  ("omission"), was given by Apollonius of Perga in his Conics.

Definition as locus of points 

An ellipse can be defined geometrically as a set or locus of points in the Euclidean plane:
 Given two fixed points  called the foci and a distance   which is greater than the distance between the foci, the ellipse is the set of points  such that the sum of the distances  is equal to :

The midpoint  of the line segment joining the foci is called the center of the ellipse. The line through the foci is called the major axis, and the line perpendicular to it through the center is the minor axis. The major axis intersects the ellipse at two vertices , which have distance  to the center. The distance  of the foci to the center is called the focal distance or linear eccentricity. The quotient  is the eccentricity.

The case  yields a circle and is included as a special type of ellipse.

The equation  can be viewed in a different way (see figure):
 If  is the circle with center  and radius , then the distance of a point  to the circle  equals the distance to the focus :
 

 is called the circular directrix (related to focus ) of the ellipse. This property should not be confused with the definition of an ellipse using a directrix line below.

Using Dandelin spheres, one can prove that any section of a cone with a plane is an ellipse, assuming the plane does not contain the apex and has slope less than that of the lines on the cone.

In Cartesian coordinates

Standard equation 
The standard form of an ellipse in Cartesian coordinates assumes that the origin is the center of the ellipse, the x-axis is the major axis, and:
 the foci are the points ,

For an arbitrary point  the distance to the focus  is
 and to the other focus . Hence the point  is on the ellipse whenever:

Removing the radicals by suitable squarings and using  (see diagram) produces the standard equation of the ellipse:

or, solved for y:

The width and height parameters  are called the semi-major and semi-minor axes. The top and bottom points  are the co-vertices.

It follows from the equation that the ellipse is symmetric with respect to the coordinate axes and hence with respect to the origin.

Parameters

Principal axes 

In principle, the canonical ellipse equation  may have  (and hence the ellipse would be taller than it is wide).

Linear eccentricity 
This is the distance from the center to a focus:  .

Eccentricity 
The eccentricity can be expressed as:
 

assuming  An ellipse with equal axes has zero eccentricity, and is a circle.

Semi-latus rectum 
The length of the chord through one focus, perpendicular to the major axis, is called the latus rectum. One half of it is the semi-latus rectum . A calculation shows:

 

The semi-latus rectum  is equal to the radius of curvature at the vertices (see section curvature).

Tangent 
An arbitrary line  intersects an ellipse at 0, 1, or 2 points, respectively called an exterior line, tangent and secant. Through any point of an ellipse there is a unique tangent. The tangent at a point  of the ellipse  has the coordinate equation:

A vector parametric equation of the tangent is:
  with 

Proof:
Let  be a point on an ellipse and  be the equation of any line  containing . Inserting the line's equation into the ellipse equation and respecting  yields:
 
There are then cases:
Because  is on the tangent and the ellipse, one obtains .
  Then line  has a second point in common with the ellipse, and is a secant.

Using (1) one finds that  is a tangent vector at point , which proves the vector equation.

(If , the ellipse is a circle and "conjugate" means "orthogonal".)

Shifted ellipse 
If the standard ellipse is shifted to have center , its equation is
 

The axes are still parallel to the x- and y-axes.

General ellipse 

In analytic geometry, the ellipse is defined as a quadric: the set of points  of the Cartesian plane that, in non-degenerate cases, satisfy the implicit equation

 

provided 

To distinguish the degenerate cases from the non-degenerate case, let ∆ be the determinant

Then the ellipse is a non-degenerate real ellipse if and only if C∆ < 0. If C∆ > 0, we have an imaginary ellipse, and if ∆ = 0, we have a point ellipse.

The general equation's coefficients can be obtained from known semi-major axis , semi-minor axis , center coordinates , and rotation angle  (the angle from the positive horizontal axis to the ellipse's major axis) using the formulae:

These expressions can be derived from the canonical equation  by an affine transformation of the coordinates :

Conversely, the canonical form parameters can be obtained from the general form coefficients by the equations:

Parametric representation

Standard parametric representation
Using trigonometric functions, a parametric representation of the standard ellipse  is:
 

Rational representation
With the substitution  and trigonometric formulae one obtains

and the rational parametric equation of an ellipse
 

which covers any point of the ellipse  except the left vertex .

For  this formula represents the right upper quarter of the ellipse moving counter-clockwise with increasing  The left vertex is the limit 

Alternately, if the parameter  is considered to be a point on the real projective line , then the corresponding rational parametrization is
 

Then 

Rational representations of conic sections are commonly used in computer-aided design (see Bezier curve).

Tangent slope as parameter
A parametric representation, which uses the slope  of the tangent at a point of the ellipse
can be obtained from the derivative of the standard representation :

With help of trigonometric formulae one obtains:

 

Here  is the slope of the tangent at the corresponding ellipse point,  is the upper and  the lower half of the ellipse. The vertices, having vertical tangents, are not covered by the representation.

The equation of the tangent at point  has the form . The still unknown  can be determined by inserting the coordinates of the corresponding ellipse point :
 

This description of the tangents of an ellipse is an essential tool for the determination of the orthoptic of an ellipse. The orthoptic article contains another proof, without differential calculus and trigonometric formulae.

General ellipse

Another definition of an ellipse uses affine transformations:
 Any ellipse is an affine image of the unit circle with equation .

Parametric representation
 

Vertices
 

(If , then .) This is derived as follows. The tangent vector at point  is:
 

At a vertex parameter , the tangent is perpendicular to the major/minor axes, so:
 

Expanding and applying the identities  gives the equation for 

Area
From Apollonios theorem (see below) one obtains:
The area of an ellipse  is

Semiaxes
With the abbreviations
  the statements of Apollonios's theorem can be written as:

Solving this nonlinear system for  yields the semiaxes:

Implicit representation
.

Conversely: If the equation
 with  
of an ellipse centered at the origin is given, then the two vectors 

point to two conjugate points and the tools developed above are applicable.

Example: For the ellipse with equation  the vectors are 
.

Rotated Standard ellipse
For  one obtains a parametric representation of the standard ellipse rotated by angle :

Ellipse in space
The definition of an ellipse in this section gives a parametric representation of an arbitrary ellipse, even in space, if one allows  to be vectors in space.

Polar forms

Polar form relative to center 

In polar coordinates, with the origin at the center of the ellipse and with the angular coordinate  measured from the major axis, the ellipse's equation is
 
where  is the eccentricity, not Euler's number

Polar form relative to focus 

If instead we use polar coordinates with the origin at one focus, with the angular coordinate  still measured from the major axis, the ellipse's equation is
 

where the sign in the denominator is negative if the reference direction  points towards the center (as illustrated on the right), and positive if that direction points away from the center.

In the slightly more general case of an ellipse with one focus at the origin and the other focus at angular coordinate , the polar form is

The angle  in these formulas is called the true anomaly of the point. The numerator of these formulas is the semi-latus rectum .

Eccentricity and the directrix property

 For an arbitrary point  of the ellipse, the quotient of the distance to one focus and to the corresponding directrix (see diagram) is equal to the eccentricity:
 

The proof for the pair  follows from the fact that  and  satisfy the equation

The second case is proven analogously.

The converse is also true and can be used to define an ellipse (in a manner similar to the definition of a parabola):
 For any point  (focus), any line  (directrix) not through , and any real number  with  the ellipse is the locus of points for which the quotient of the distances to the point and to the line is  that is:
 

However, one may consider the directrix of a circle to be the line at infinity in the projective plane.

(The choice  yields a parabola, and if , a hyperbola.)

Proof

Let , and assume  is a point on the curve.
The directrix  has equation . With , the relation  produces the equations
 and 

The substitution  yields
 

This is the equation of an ellipse, or a parabola, or a hyperbola. All of these non-degenerate conics have, in common, the origin as a vertex (see diagram).

If , introduce new parameters  so that , and then the equation above becomes

which is the equation of an ellipse with center , the x-axis as major axis, and
the major/minor semi axis .

Construction of a directrix

Because of  point  of directrix  (see diagram) and focus  are inverse with respect to the circle inversion at circle  (in diagram green). Hence  can be constructed as shown in the diagram. Directrix  is the perpendicular to the main axis at point .

General ellipse

(The right side of the equation uses the Hesse normal form of a line to calculate the distance .)

Focus-to-focus reflection property 

An ellipse possesses the following property:
 The normal at a point  bisects the angle between the lines .

 Proof
Because the tangent is perpendicular to the normal, the statement is true for the tangent and the supplementary angle of the angle between the lines to the foci (see diagram), too.

Let  be the point on the line  with the distance  to the focus ,  is the semi-major axis of the ellipse. Let line  be the bisector of the supplementary angle to the angle between the lines . In order to prove that  is the tangent line at point , one checks that any point  on line  which is different from  cannot be on the ellipse. Hence  has only point  in common with the ellipse and is, therefore, the tangent at point .

From the diagram and the triangle inequality one recognizes that  holds, which means:  . But if  is a point of the ellipse, the sum should be .

 Application
The rays from one focus are reflected by the ellipse to the second focus. This property has optical and acoustic applications similar to the reflective property of a parabola (see whispering gallery).

Conjugate diameters

Definition of conjugate diameters 

A circle has the following property:
 The midpoints of parallel chords lie on a diameter.

An affine transformation preserves parallelism and midpoints of line segments, so this property is true for any ellipse. (Note that the parallel chords and the diameter are no longer orthogonal.)

 Definition
Two diameters  of an ellipse are conjugate if the midpoints of chords parallel to  lie on 

From the diagram one finds:

Conjugate diameters in an ellipse generalize orthogonal diameters in a circle.

In the parametric equation for a general ellipse given above,
 

any pair of points  belong to a diameter, and the pair  belong to its conjugate diameter.

For the common parametric representation  of the ellipse with equation  one gets: The points 
 (signs: (+,+) or (-,-) )
 (signs: (-,+) or (+,-) )
are conjugate and 

In case of a circle the last equation collapses to

Theorem of Apollonios on conjugate diameters 

For an ellipse with semi-axes  the following is true:

 Let  and   be halves of two conjugate diameters (see diagram) then
 .
 The parallelogram of tangents adjacent to the given conjugate diameters has the 

 Proof
Let the ellipse be in the canonical form with parametric equation
 .

The two points  are on conjugate diameters (see previous section). From trigonometric formulae one obtains  and
 

 

Hence

Orthogonal tangents 

For the ellipse  the intersection points of orthogonal tangents lie on the circle  .

This circle is called orthoptic or director circle of the ellipse (not to be confused with the circular directrix defined above).

Drawing ellipses 

Ellipses appear in descriptive geometry as images (parallel or central projection) of circles. There exist various tools to draw an ellipse. Computers provide the fastest and most accurate method for drawing an ellipse. However, technical tools (ellipsographs) to draw an ellipse without a computer exist. The principle of ellipsographs were known to Greek mathematicians such as Archimedes and Proklos.

If there is no ellipsograph available, one can draw an ellipse using an approximation by the four osculating circles at the vertices.

For any method described below, knowledge of the axes and the semi-axes is necessary (or equivalently: the foci and the semi-major axis).
If this presumption is not fulfilled one has to know at least two conjugate diameters. With help of Rytz's construction the axes and semi-axes can be retrieved.

de La Hire's point construction 
The following construction of single points of an ellipse is due to de La Hire.  It is based on the standard parametric representation  of an ellipse:
 Draw the two circles centered at the center of the ellipse with radii  and the axes of the ellipse.
 Draw a line through  that is parallel to the minor axis and a line through  that is parallel to the major axis. These lines meet at an ellipse point (see diagram).
 Repeat steps (2) and (3) with different lines through the center.

Pins-and-string method
The characterization of an ellipse as the locus of points so that sum of the distances to the foci is constant leads to a method of drawing one using two drawing pins, a length of string, and a pencil. In this method, pins are pushed into the paper at two points, which become the ellipse's foci. The tip of the pencil then traces an ellipse if it is moved while keeping the string taut. Using two pegs and a rope, gardeners use this procedure to outline an elliptical flower bed—thus it is called the gardener's ellipse.

A similar method for drawing confocal ellipses with a closed string is due to the Irish bishop Charles Graves.

Paper strip methods 
The two following methods rely on the parametric representation (see section parametric representation, above):
 

This representation can be modeled technically by two simple methods. In both cases center, the axes and semi axes  have to be known.

Method 1
The first method starts with
 a strip of paper of length .

If the strip slides with both ends on the axes of the desired ellipse, then point  traces the ellipse. For the proof one shows that point  has the parametric representation , where parameter  is the angle of the slope of the paper strip.

A technical realization of the motion of the paper strip can be achieved by a Tusi couple (see animation). The device is able to draw any ellipse with a fixed sum , which is the radius of the large circle. This restriction may be a disadvantage in real life. More flexible is the second paper strip method.

A variation of the paper strip method 1 uses the observation that the midpoint  of the paper strip is moving on the circle with center  (of the ellipse) and radius . After this operation the movement of the unchanged half of the paperstrip is unchanged. This variation requires only one sliding shoe.

 Method 2
The second method starts with
 a strip of paper of length .

The strip is positioned onto the axes as described in the diagram. Then the free end of the strip traces an ellipse, while the strip is moved.

This method is the base for several ellipsographs (see section below).

Similar to the variation of the paper strip method 1 a variation of the paper strip method 2 can be established (see diagram) by cutting the part between the axes into halves.
Most ellipsograph drafting instruments are based on the second paperstrip method.

Approximation by osculating circles 
From Metric properties below, one obtains:
 The radius of curvature at the vertices  is: 
 The radius of curvature at the co-vertices  is: 

The diagram shows an easy way to find the centers of curvature  at vertex  and co-vertex , respectively:
 mark the auxiliary point  and draw the line segment 
 draw the line through , which is perpendicular to the line 
 the intersection points of this line with the axes are the centers of the osculating circles.
(proof: simple calculation.)

The centers for the remaining vertices are found by symmetry.

With help of a French curve one draws a curve, which has smooth contact to the osculating circles.

Steiner generation 

The following method to construct single points of an ellipse relies on the Steiner generation of a conic section:

For the generation of points of the ellipse  one uses the pencils at the vertices .

 is the center of the rectangle . The side   of the rectangle is divided into n equal spaced line segments and this division is projected parallel with the diagonal  as direction onto the line segment   and assign the division as shown in the diagram. With help of the points  the points of the second quarter of the ellipse can be determined. Analogously one obtains the points of the lower half of the ellipse.

Steiner generation can also be defined for hyperbolas and parabolas. It is sometimes called a parallelogram method because one can use other points rather than the vertices, which starts with a parallelogram instead of a rectangle.

As hypotrochoid 

The ellipse is a special case of the hypotrochoid when , as shown in the adjacent image. The special case of a moving circle with radius  inside a circle with radius  is called a Tusi couple.

Inscribed angles and three-point form

Circles 

A circle with equation  is uniquely determined by three points  not on a line. A simple way to determine the parameters  uses the inscribed angle theorem for circles:
 For four points  (see diagram) the following statement is true:

Usually one measures inscribed angles by a degree or radian θ, but here the following measurement is more convenient:
 In order to measure the angle between two lines with equations   one uses the quotient:

Inscribed angle theorem for circles
For four points   no three of them on a line, we have the following (see diagram):

In terms of the angle measurement above, this means:
 

At first the measure is available only for chords not parallel to the y-axis, but the final formula works for any chord.

Three-point form of circle equation

 As a consequence, one obtains an equation for the circle determined by three non-colinear points :
 

For example, for  the three-point equation is:
 , which can be rearranged to 

Using vectors, dot products and determinants this formula can be arranged more clearly, letting :
 

The center of the circle  satisfies:
 

The radius is the distance between any of the three points and the center.

Ellipses 
This section, we consider the family of ellipses defined by equations  with a fixed eccentricity . It is convenient to use the parameter:
 

and to write the ellipse equation as:
 

where q is fixed and  vary over the real numbers. (Such ellipses have their axes parallel to the coordinate axes: if , the major axis is parallel to the x-axis; if , it is parallel to the y-axis.)

Like a circle, such an ellipse is determined by three points not on a line.

For this family of ellipses, one introduces the following q-analog angle measure, which is not a function of the usual angle measure θ:
 In order to measure an angle between two lines with equations  one uses the quotient:

Inscribed angle theorem for ellipses

 Given four points , no three of them on a line (see diagram).
 

At first the measure is available only for chords which are not parallel to the y-axis. But the final formula works for any chord. The proof follows from a straightforward calculation. For the direction of proof given that the points are on an ellipse, one can assume that the center of the ellipse is the origin.

Three-point form of ellipse equation

 A consequence, one obtains an equation for the ellipse determined by three non-colinear points :
 

  and after conversion 

Analogously to the circle case, the equation can be written more clearly using vectors:
 

where  is the modified dot product

Pole-polar relation 

Any ellipse can be described in a suitable coordinate system by an equation . The equation of the tangent at a point  of the ellipse is  If one allows point  to be an arbitrary point different from the origin, then
 point  is mapped onto the line , not through the center of the ellipse.

This relation between points and lines is a bijection.

The inverse function maps
 line  onto the point  and
 line  onto the point 

Such a relation between points and lines generated by a conic is called pole-polar relation or polarity. The pole is the point; the polar the line.

By calculation one can confirm the following properties of the pole-polar relation of the ellipse:
 For a point (pole) on the ellipse, the polar is the tangent at this point.
 For a pole  outside the ellipse, the intersection points of its polar with the ellipse are the tangency points of the two tangents passing .
 For a point within the ellipse, the polar has no point with the ellipse in common.

 The intersection point of two polars is the pole of the line through their poles.
Because they are even polar pairs with respect to the circle , the directrices can be constructed by compass and straightedge (see Inversive geometry).

Pole-polar relations exist for hyperbolas and parabolas as well.

Metric properties 
All metric properties given below refer to an ellipse with equation

except for the section on the area enclosed by a tilted ellipse, where the generalized form of Eq.() will be given.

Area 
The area  enclosed by an ellipse is:

The area formula  is intuitive: start with a circle of radius  (so its area is ) and stretch it by a factor  to make an ellipse. It is also easy to rigorously prove the area formula using integration as follows. Equation can be rewritten as   For  this curve is the top half of the ellipse.
 

The second integral is the area of a circle of radius  that is,  So
 

An ellipse defined implicitly by  has area 

However, some applications require tilted ellipses. In charged-particle beam optics, for instance, the enclosed area of an erect or tilted ellipse is an important property of the beam, its emittance. In this case a simple formula still applies, namely

It follows directly from Apollonios's theorem.

Circumference

The circumference  of an ellipse is:
 

where again  is the length of the semi-major axis,  is the eccentricity, and the function  is the complete elliptic integral of the second kind,
 
which is in general not an elementary function.

The circumference of the ellipse may be evaluated in terms of  using Gauss's arithmetic-geometric mean; this is a quadratically converging iterative method (see here for details).

The exact infinite series is:

where  is the double factorial (extended to negative odd integers by the recurrence relation , for ).  This series converges, but by expanding in terms of  James Ivory and Bessel derived an expression that converges much more rapidly:

Srinivasa Ramanujan gave two close approximations for the circumference in §16 of "Modular Equations and Approximations to "; they are
 

and
 

where  takes on the same meaning as above. The errors in these approximations, which were obtained empirically, are of order  and  respectively.

Arc length

The upper half of an ellipse is parameterized by
 

 

This is equivalent to
 

where  is the incomplete elliptic integral of the second kind with parameter 

 

Here the upper bound  is the circumference of a circumscribed concentric circle passing through the endpoints of the ellipse's major axis, and the lower bound  is the perimeter of an inscribed rhombus with vertices at the endpoints of the major and the minor axes.

Curvature 
The curvature is given by 
radius of curvature at point :
 

Radius of curvature at the two vertices  and the centers of curvature:
 

Radius of curvature at the two co-vertices  and the centers of curvature:

In triangle geometry 
Ellipses appear in triangle geometry as
 Steiner ellipse: ellipse through the vertices of the triangle with center at the centroid,
 inellipses: ellipses which touch the sides of a triangle.  Special cases are the Steiner inellipse and the Mandart inellipse.

As plane sections of quadrics 
Ellipses appear as plane sections of the following quadrics:
 Ellipsoid
 Elliptic cone
 Elliptic cylinder
 Hyperboloid of one sheet
 Hyperboloid of two sheets

Applications

Physics

Elliptical reflectors and acoustics 

If the water's surface is disturbed at one focus of an elliptical water tank, the circular waves of that disturbance, after reflecting off the walls, converge simultaneously to a single point: the second focus. This is a consequence of the total travel length being the same along any wall-bouncing path between the two foci.

Similarly, if a light source is placed at one focus of an elliptic mirror, all light rays on the plane of the ellipse are reflected to the second focus. Since no other smooth curve has such a property, it can be used as an alternative definition of an ellipse. (In the special case of a circle with a source at its center all light would be reflected back to the center.) If the ellipse is rotated along its major axis to produce an ellipsoidal mirror (specifically, a prolate spheroid), this property holds for all rays out of the source. Alternatively, a cylindrical mirror with elliptical cross-section can be used to focus light from a linear fluorescent lamp along a line of the paper; such mirrors are used in some document scanners.

Sound waves are reflected in a similar way, so in a large elliptical room a person standing at one focus can hear a person standing at the other focus remarkably well. The effect is even more evident under a vaulted roof shaped as a section of a prolate spheroid. Such a room is called a whisper chamber. The same effect can be demonstrated with two reflectors shaped like the end caps of such a spheroid, placed facing each other at the proper distance. Examples are the National Statuary Hall at the United States Capitol (where John Quincy Adams is said to have used this property for eavesdropping on political matters); the Mormon Tabernacle at Temple Square in Salt Lake City, Utah; at an exhibit on sound at the Museum of Science and Industry in Chicago; in front of the University of Illinois at Urbana–Champaign Foellinger Auditorium; and also at a side chamber of the Palace of Charles V, in the Alhambra.

Planetary orbits 

In the 17th century, Johannes Kepler discovered that the orbits along which the planets travel around the Sun are ellipses with the Sun [approximately] at one focus, in his first law of planetary motion. Later, Isaac Newton explained this as a corollary of his law of universal gravitation.

More generally, in the gravitational two-body problem, if the two bodies are bound to each other (that is, the total energy is negative), their orbits are similar ellipses with the common barycenter being one of the foci of each ellipse. The other focus of either ellipse has no known physical significance. The orbit of either body in the reference frame of the other is also an ellipse, with the other body at the same focus.

Keplerian elliptical orbits are the result of any radially directed attraction force whose strength is inversely proportional to the square of the distance. Thus, in principle, the motion of two oppositely charged particles in empty space would also be an ellipse. (However, this conclusion ignores losses due to electromagnetic radiation and quantum effects, which become significant when the particles are moving at high speed.)

For elliptical orbits, useful relations involving the eccentricity  are:

 

where
  is the radius at apoapsis (the farthest distance)
  is the radius at periapsis (the closest distance)
  is the length of the semi-major axis

In other words,

.

Harmonic oscillators 
The general solution for a harmonic oscillator in two or more dimensions is also an ellipse. Such is the case, for instance, of a long pendulum that is free to move in two dimensions; of a mass attached to a fixed point by a perfectly elastic spring; or of any object that moves under influence of an attractive force that is directly proportional to its distance from a fixed attractor. Unlike Keplerian orbits, however, these "harmonic orbits" have the center of attraction at the geometric center of the ellipse, and have fairly simple equations of motion.

Phase visualization 
In electronics, the relative phase of two sinusoidal signals can be compared by feeding them to the vertical and horizontal inputs of an oscilloscope. If the Lissajous figure display is an ellipse, rather than a straight line, the two signals are out of phase.

Elliptical gears 
Two non-circular gears with the same elliptical outline, each pivoting around one focus and positioned at the proper angle, turn smoothly while maintaining contact at all times. Alternatively, they can be connected by a link chain or timing belt, or in the case of a bicycle the main chainring may be elliptical, or an ovoid similar to an ellipse in form. Such elliptical gears may be used in mechanical equipment to produce variable angular speed or torque from a constant rotation of the driving axle, or in the case of a bicycle to allow a varying crank rotation speed with inversely varying mechanical advantage.

Elliptical bicycle gears make it easier for the chain to slide off the cog when changing gears.

An example gear application would be a device that winds thread onto a conical bobbin on a spinning machine. The bobbin would need to wind faster when the thread is near the apex than when it is near the base.

Optics 
 In a material that is optically anisotropic (birefringent), the refractive index depends on the direction of the light. The dependency can be described by an index ellipsoid. (If the material is optically isotropic, this ellipsoid is a sphere.)
 In lamp-pumped solid-state lasers, elliptical cylinder-shaped reflectors have been used to direct light from the pump lamp (coaxial with one ellipse focal axis) to the active medium rod (coaxial with the second focal axis).
 In laser-plasma produced EUV light sources used in microchip lithography, EUV light is generated by plasma positioned in the primary focus of an ellipsoid mirror and is collected in the secondary focus at the input of the lithography machine.

Statistics and finance
In statistics, a bivariate random vector  is jointly elliptically distributed if its iso-density contours—loci of equal values of the density function—are ellipses. The concept extends to an arbitrary number of elements of the random vector, in which case in general the iso-density contours are ellipsoids. A special case is the multivariate normal distribution. The elliptical distributions are important in finance because if rates of return on assets are jointly elliptically distributed then all portfolios can be characterized completely by their mean and variance—that is, any two portfolios with identical mean and variance of portfolio return have identical distributions of portfolio return.

Computer graphics 
Drawing an ellipse as a graphics primitive is common in standard display libraries, such as the MacIntosh QuickDraw API, and Direct2D on Windows. Jack Bresenham at IBM is most famous for the invention of 2D drawing primitives, including line and circle drawing, using only fast integer operations such as addition and branch on carry bit. M. L. V. Pitteway extended Bresenham's algorithm for lines to conics in 1967. Another efficient generalization to draw ellipses was invented in 1984 by Jerry Van Aken.

In 1970 Danny Cohen presented at the "Computer Graphics 1970" conference in England a linear algorithm for drawing ellipses and circles. In 1971, L. B. Smith published similar algorithms for all conic sections and proved them to have good properties. These algorithms need only a few multiplications and additions to calculate each vector.

It is beneficial to use a parametric formulation in computer graphics because the density of points is greatest where there is the most curvature. Thus, the change in slope between each successive point is small, reducing the apparent "jaggedness" of the approximation.

Drawing with Bézier paths
Composite Bézier curves may also be used to draw an ellipse to sufficient accuracy, since any ellipse may be construed as an affine transformation of a circle. The spline methods used to draw a circle may be used to draw an ellipse, since the constituent Bézier curves behave appropriately under such transformations.

Optimization theory 
It is sometimes useful to find the minimum bounding ellipse on a set of points. The ellipsoid method is quite useful for solving this problem.

See also 

 Cartesian oval, a generalization of the ellipse
 Circumconic and inconic
 Distance of closest approach of ellipses
 Ellipse fitting
 Elliptic coordinates, an orthogonal coordinate system based on families of ellipses and hyperbolae
 Elliptic partial differential equation
 Elliptical distribution, in statistics
 Elliptical dome
 Geodesics on an ellipsoid
 Great ellipse
 Kepler's laws of planetary motion
 n-ellipse, a generalization of the ellipse for n foci
 Oval
 Spheroid, the ellipsoid obtained by rotating an ellipse about its major or minor axis
 Stadium (geometry), a two-dimensional geometric shape constructed of a rectangle with semicircles at a pair of opposite sides
 Steiner circumellipse, the unique ellipse circumscribing a triangle and sharing its centroid
 Superellipse, a generalization of an ellipse that can look more rectangular or more "pointy"
 True, eccentric, and mean anomaly

Notes

References

External links 
 
 
 
 
 
 Apollonius' Derivation of the Ellipse at Convergence
 The Shape and History of The Ellipse in Washington, D.C. by Clark Kimberling
 Ellipse circumference calculator
 Collection of animated ellipse demonstrations
 
 Trammel according Frans van Schooten
  by Matt Parker

Conic sections
Plane curves
Elementary shapes
Algebraic curves